Richard Peter "Dick" Rodenhiser (born October 17, 1932 in Malden, Massachusetts) is an American ice hockey player. He won a silver medal at the 1956 Winter Olympics and a gold medal at the 1960 Winter Olympics.

Awards and honors

References

External links
 

1932 births
American men's ice hockey forwards
Ice hockey players from Massachusetts
Ice hockey players at the 1956 Winter Olympics
Ice hockey players at the 1960 Winter Olympics
Living people
Medalists at the 1956 Winter Olympics
Medalists at the 1960 Winter Olympics
Olympic gold medalists for the United States in ice hockey
Olympic silver medalists for the United States in ice hockey
Sportspeople from Malden, Massachusetts
AHCA Division I men's ice hockey All-Americans
Boston University Terriers men's ice hockey players